Andrew Welsh-Huggins is an American journalist and author of both fiction and nonfiction books about crime. He graduated from Kenyon College.

Welsh-Huggins is legal-affairs reporter for the Associated Press in Columbus, Ohio.

He is the author of the Andy Hayes series of mystery novels, featuring a former Ohio State Buckeyes quarterback working as a private investigator.

Books

Non-fiction
No Winners Here Tonight: Race, Politics, and Geography in One of the Country's Busiest Death Penalty States (2009) Ohio University Press.
Hatred at Home: Al-Qaida on Trial in the American Midwest (2011) Ohio University Press.

Fiction
Fourth Down and Out: An Andy Hayes Mystery (2014) Swallow Press
Slow Burn: An Andy Hayes Mystery (2015) Swallow Press
Capitol Punishment: An Andy Hayes Mystery (2016) Swallow Press
The Hunt: An Andy Hayes Mystery (2017) Swallow Press

References

External links
 Author web page

Living people
Associated Press people
Kenyon College alumni
American mystery writers
Writers from Columbus, Ohio
Novelists from Ohio
Year of birth missing (living people)